Paul Timothy Jones (born 6 February 1974) is an English former professional footballer who played in the Football League for Birmingham City.

Jones was born in Solihull, West Midlands. When he left school in 1990, he joined Birmingham City as a YTS trainee, and turned professional two years later. A winger, he made his first and only Football League appearance in the Third Division on 14 September 1991, coming on as substitute for the injured Foley Okenla in a 1–1 draw at home to Peterborough United. His only other first-team game was in the League Cup, also as a substitute, and he left to join Moor Green in the 1993 close season.

References

1974 births
Living people
Sportspeople from Solihull
English footballers
Association football wingers
Birmingham City F.C. players
Moor Green F.C. players
English Football League players